The Student and Exchange Visitor Program (SEVP) is a program within U.S. Immigration and Customs Enforcement, which is under the U.S. Department of Homeland Security, to manage foreign students and exchange visitors in the United States through the Student and Exchange Visitor Information System (SEVIS). The SEVP encompasses the F status (for foreign students in the United States in academic programs and their dependents), J status (for exchange visitors in the United States and their dependents), and M status (for foreign students in the United States in vocational programs and their dependents). The exchange visitor part of the program (J visa) is managed by the U.S. Department of State, although the SEVIS system is maintained by ICE.

The SEVP does not manage the issuance of the visas themselves. Visas are issued at United States consulates and embassies in other countries, which fall under the United States Department of State's Bureau of Consular Affairs. However, having the correct status and information in the SEVIS system is necessary for a person to be able to receive a F, J, or M visa.

The SEVP does not cover some other statuses that can be used by foreign students in the United States, such as the H-4 status and other statuses for dependents of people in non-student statuses.

Jargon

History

Pre-origins: CIPRIS 
In the 1993 World Trade Center bombing, a truck bomb was detonated below the North Tower of the World Trade Center in New York City. In the aftermath of this incident, the student visa came under increased scrutiny when it was discovered that Eyad Ismoil, one of the terrorists involved was in the United States on an expired student visa.

A memorandum from the U.S. Department of Justice's Office of Investigative Agency Policies to the Deputy Attorney General dated September 24, 1994, mentioned the need to subject foreign students to thorough and continuing scrutiny before and during their stay in the United States. On April 17, 1995, the Deputy Attorney General asked the INS Commissioner to address this issue. This led to the formation of an INS task force in June 1995 to conduct a comprehensive review of the F, M, and J visa processes. Besides the INS, the task force included members from the State Department and the United States Information Agency, and experts in the administration of international student programs. The task force report, issued on December 22, 1995, identified problems in the tracking and monitoring of students by schools, problems in the certification of schools by the INS, and problems with INS receiving and maintaining up-to-date records from schools. As a result of these findings, the Illegal Immigration Reform and Immigrant Responsibility Act of 1996 directed the Attorney General, in consultation with the Secretary of State, to develop and conduct a program to collect certain information on nonimmigrant foreign students and exchange visitors from approved institutions of higher education and designated exchange visitor programs.

In June 1997, the INS launched a pilot program for a centralized electronic reporting system for institutions, called the Coordinated Interagency Partnership Regulating International Students (CIPRIS). The CIPRIS pilot officially ended in October 1999, as the INS felt it had gathered enough data from the prototype to start working on the nationwide system. The INS began working on a new system that would be called the Student and Exchange Visitor Program (SEVP) with the associated information system called the Student and Exchange Visitor Information Service (SEVIS). During the rollout, CIPRIS and SEVIS met with considerable opposition from the Association of International Educators and the American Council on Education. However, they claimed that the opposition was not against the programs in principle but due to the concern that a botched rollout by the INS could result in many students suffering.

Launch after the September 11 attacks 
In the aftermath of the September 11 attacks (September 11, 2001) and the Patriot Act passed in response (October 26, 2001), there was further increase in scrutiny of student visas, increasing the momentum in favor of the adoption of SEVIS. This was partly because one of the attackers, Hani Hanjour, had come to the United States on a student visa.

Below is a timeline of the key events in the two years after the attacks describing the key steps in the evolution of SEVIS:

History of release versions 
SEVIS has undergone six major releases since its launch. The release is numbered using a major release version number followed by a dot and a minor release version number. Below is a partial list of release dates:

During the first half of 2012, changes that affect all colleges, universities, and other educational institutions that provide English language training ("ESL") programs began. These changes stem from the Accreditation of English Language Training Act ("Accreditation Act"), which became effective in June 2011. Pursuant to the Accreditation Act, ESL programs that enroll foreign nonimmigrant students must obtain accreditation from a regional or national accreditation agency recognized by the United States Department of Education. The Accreditation Act applies to two types of ESL programs: Stand-Alone ESL Schools whose officials have indicated on the school's Form I-17 the intention to offer only ESL programs of study; and Combined Schools whose officials have indicated on the school's Form I-17 that the school offers an ESL program of study, as well as other programs of study. A Combined School may either contract out the ESL program of study or wholly own and operate the ESL program of study under the institution's governance.

Mandatory reporting requirements 
Schools and programs approved to host students and scholars on these visas are required to report certain information. Information that must be reported includes:
 Change of legal name
 Change of U.S. address
 Change of major field of study
 Change of education degree level
 Change of funding
 Authorization for off-campus employment

In addition, they must report events that constitute a violation of the international visitor's visa status, such as academic suspension, criminal conviction, failure to enroll and unauthorized off-campus employment.

COVID-19 pandemic change
Amid the COVID-19 pandemic, the SEVP program allowed international students to take more online coursework in the spring and summer semesters of 2020 to accommodate the various state-mandated school closures and stay-at-home orders without penalizing the students. On July 6, 2020, ICE issued a regulation that stated that for any current international visitor under SEVP to remain in the country come the fall 2020 semesters, they must return to taking most of their coursework in person, limiting any online coursework to a maximum of one class or three credit hours online, or be enrolled in a hybrid system but still required to take some physical classes. Students failing to meet these would be face "immigration consequences including, but not limited to, the initiation of removal proceedings", and students who had indicated they would be taking only online classes would be denied visas.

The new change was criticized by students, schools, and states alike, as with the pandemic worsening in most of the United States at the time, many schools did not have plans to commit to opening to physical classes in the fall semester, leaving these international students at risk of deportation. At least three separate lawsuits were filed against ICE on the changed within the week on the basis that the decision was arbitrary and capricious and failed the Administrative Procedure Act: A joint suit by Harvard University and MIT, the state of California, and a separate collation of 17 states and the District of Columbia. Prior to a second hearing where it was expected that a preliminary injunction was to be placed on the new ruling on July 14, 2020, ICE affirmed it would rescind the new rule and continue to allow international students to participate in online classes.

Fee

Fee for students and exchange visitors 
In 2004, the United States Congress mandated that all international students and exchange visitors pay the I-901 SEVIS fee, which funds the Student and Exchange Visitor Program (SEVP) and SEVIS. The fee can be paid online at fmjfee.com. As of June 24, 2019, the fees are as follows:

The SEVIS fee must be paid after receiving the initial document (I-20 or DS-2019) and is a prerequisite for obtaining the F, J, or M visa, or if transitioning to student status using Form I-539.

The fee needs to be paid only for the principal (the F-1, J-1, or M-1). Dependents (F-2, J-2, and M-2) do not need to pay the fee. Also, the fee needs to be paid only once per initial SEVIS record, and in particular, does not need to be paid again if applying for a new visa on the same status. It is distinct from the visa fees, which need to be paid for each visa application.

Fee for schools seeking SEVP certification 
Below is the list of fees for schools seeking SEVP certification (through Form I-17) or re-certification, as of January 2017.

See also
 Department of Homeland Security
 U.S. Immigration and Customs Enforcement
 U.S. Customs and Border Protection

Notes

External links
 Official DHS SEVIS website
DHS Study in the States website
 International student registry deadline arrives, CNN, August 1, 2003

History of immigration to the United States
Student exchange
U.S. Immigration and Customs Enforcement